The 1992 Benson & Hedges Cup was the twenty-first edition of cricket's Benson & Hedges Cup.

Durham were accorded first-class status at the start of the 1992 season, and joined the competition for the first time. The number of competitors accordingly increased to 21, resulting in six teams in Group A.
The competition was won by Hampshire County Cricket Club.

Fixtures and results

Group stage

Group A

Source:

Group B

Source:

Group C

Source:

Group D

Source:

Quarter-finals

Semi-finals

Final

References

See also
Benson & Hedges Cup

Benson & Hedges Cup seasons
1992 in English cricket